Efiaimbalo (born c. 1925, deceased 2006) is a Malagasy sculptor.

Efiaimbalo was born in Androka, where he lived and worked. A member of the Mahafaly people, he carves aloalos, wooden stele that serve as traditional grave markers.  He incorporated modern symbols of wealth, such as aircraft and cars, into his designs, combining them with more traditional elements and carving them out of native hardwood. His work is in the collection of Jean Pigozzi.

References

1920s births
2006 deaths
Malagasy sculptors
Male sculptors
Mahafaly people
People from Atsimo-Andrefana
20th-century sculptors
21st-century sculptors